The Maharashtra Pollution Control Board (established 7 September 1970) implements a range of environmental legislation in the state of Maharashtra, India. The MPCB  functions under the administrative control of Environment Department of the Government of Maharashtra.

Responsibilities and Functions
It is mainly responsible for:
 Water (Prevention and Control of Pollution) Act, 1974,
 Air (Prevention and Control of Pollution) Act, 1981,
 Water (Cess) Act, 1977
 Some of the provisions under Environmental (Protection) Act, 1986 and the rules framed under this like:
 Biomedical Waste (M&H) Rules, 2016,
 Hazardous Waste (M&H) Rules, 2016,
Municipal Solid Waste Rules, 2016 etc.

It was established under the provisions of Maharashtra Prevention of Water Pollution Act, 1969.

Some of the important functions of MPCB are;

 To plan comprehensive program for the prevention, control or abatement of pollution and secure executions thereof,
  To collect and disseminate information relating to pollution and the prevention, control or abatement thereof,
  To inspect sewage or trade effluent treatment and disposal facilities, and air pollution control systems and to review plans, specification or any other data relating to the treatment plants, disposal systems and air pollution control systems in connection with the consent granted,
  Supporting and encouraging the developments in the fields of pollution control, waste recycle reuse, eco-friendly practices etc.
  To educate and guide the entrepreneurs in improving environment by suggesting appropriate pollution control technologies and techniques
  Creation of public awareness about the clean and healthy environment and attending the public complaints regarding pollution.

Criticism 
During a hearing of a PIL on the Panchganga river pollution, the court find that successive state governments had not appointed members for the board since its establishment on 7 September 1970. The appointment of board members is obligatory as stipulated in the Water (Prevention and Control of Pollution) Act, 1974. There is no data available whether the government has ever appointed members other than the secretary-level officers.

See also
Awaaz Foundation  is a Non-governmental organisation in India, works towards preserving and enhancing environment and for other socially oriented causes.
MPCB-CASI MAHA Model United Nations  is a student led simulation of the United Nations held in Maharashtra, where all Universities across Maharashtra participate in. Organised by Maharashtra Pollution Control Board, Environment Department and Public Works Department | Government of Maharashtra.

References

External links
MPCB official web site

1970 establishments in Maharashtra
Government agencies established in 1970
State pollution control boards of India
State agencies of Maharashtra
Environment of Maharashtra